This list is for 2005–06 NHL transactions within professional ice hockey league of players in North America. The following contains team-to-team transactions that occurred in the National Hockey League during the 2005–06 NHL season.  It lists what team each player has been traded to, or claimed by, and for which players or draft picks, if applicable.

July 

Notes
 Philadelphia traded this pick to Phoenix on July 30, 2005.
 This pick was previously acquired by Carolina on a trade with Phoenix on June 26, 2004. Phoenix acquired Carolina's 3rd round pick in 2004 for this pick.
 This pick was previously acquired by Carolina on a trade with Atlanta on June 26, 2004. Atlanta acquired Carolina's 4th round pick in 2004 for this pick.
 This pick was previously acquired by Minnesota on a trade with Colorado on February 25, 2004.  Colorado acquired Darby Hendrickson and Minnesota's 8th round pick in 2004 for this pick.
 This pick was previously acquired by Atlanta on a trade with San Jose on July 30, 2005.  San Jose acquired Atlanta's 1st round pick in 2005 for San Jose's 1st round, 2nd round and this pick in 2005.
 This pick was previously acquired by the New York Rangers on a trade with Philadelphia on March 8, 2004.  Philadelphia acquired Vladimir Malakhov for Rick Kozak and this pick.
 San Jose traded this pick to the New York Islanders on June 24, 2006.
 Philadelphia traded this pick to Phoenix on March 9, 2006.  Phoenix traded this pick to Detroit on June 24, 2006.
 Carolina traded this pick to St. Louis on January 30, 2006.
 This pick was previously acquired by Philadelphia on a trade with Dallas on March 8, 2004. Dallas acquired Chris Therien for Dallas' 8th round pick in 2004 and this pick.
 Philadelphia traded this pick to Phoenix on March 9, 2006.  Phoenix traded this pick to Detroit on June 24, 2006.
 This pick was previously acquired by Carolina on a trade with Toronto on March 9, 2004. Toronto acquired Ron Francis for this pick.
 Carolina traded this pick to Chicago on December 30, 2005.  Chicago traded this pick to Toronto on June 24, 2006.
 This pick was previously acquired by Philadelphia on a trade with Anaheim on July 30, 2005. Anaheim acquired Todd Fedoruk for this pick.
 This pick was previously acquired by Phoenix on a trade with Columbus on July 6, 2004. Columbus acquired Radoslav Suchy and Phoenix's 6th round pick in 2005 for this pick.
 This pick was previously acquired by Washington on a trade with Ottawa on February 18, 2004. Ottawa acquired Peter Bondra for Brooks Laich and this pick.

August 

Notes
 Edmonton traded this pick back to Boston on August 30, 2005.  Boston traded this pick to the New York Islanders on June 24, 2006.  The Islanders traded this pick to San Jose on June 24, 2006.
 Philadelphia traded this pick to Los Angeles on August 4, 2005.
 The conditions of this pick are unknown. New York Islanders traded this pick to Colorado on June 24, 2006.
 The conditions of this pick are unknown. Vancouver traded this pick to Anaheim on March 9, 2006.
 This pick was previously acquired by Philadelphia on a trade with Nashville on August 2, 2005. Nashville acquired Danny Markov for this pick.
 Calgary traded this pick to Colorado on June 23, 2007.
 The conditions of this pick are unknown. Anaheim traded this pick back to the Rangers on January 8, 2006.  The Rangers traded this pick to Washington on June 24, 2006.
 The conditions of this pick are unknown.
 This pick was previously acquired by Edmonton on a trade with Boston on August 1, 2005.  Boston acquired Brad Isbister for this pick. Boston traded this pick to the New York Islanders on June 24, 2006.  The Islanders traded this pick to San Jose on June 24, 2006.

September 

Notes
 The conditions of this pick are unknown.  Pittsburgh traded this pick to Florida on June 24, 2006.
 The conditions of this pick are unknown.

October 

Notes
 The conditions of this pick are unknown.
 The conditions were not met.

November 

Notes
 Boston traded this pick to the New York Islanders on June 24, 2006.
 The conditions of this pick are unknown.
 The conditions of this pick are unknown.

December 

Notes
 Washington traded this pick to the New York Rangers on June 24, 2006.
 Philadelphia traded this pick to Montreal on June 24, 2006.
 Carolina traded this pick to St. Louis on January 30, 2006.

January 

Notes
 This pick was previously acquired by Anaheim on a trade with the New York Rangers on August 23, 2005. The Rangers acquired Steve Rucchin for Trevor Gillies and this pick.  The Rangers traded this pick to Washington on June 24, 2006.
 The Flyers had an option to swap the 4th round pick in the 2006 draft and 3rd round pick in the 2007 draft with Phoenix.  The option was exercised for the 2006 draft but not for the 2007 draft.
 Phoenix traded this pick to the New York Islanders on June 24, 2006.
 This pick was included to complete a trade with Chicago on December 30, 2005.  Originally, Chicago acquired Radim Vrbata for future considerations. Carolina traded this pick to St. Louis in January 30, 2006.
 This pick was previously acquired by Carolina on a trade with Columbus on July 30, 2005. Columbus acquired Carolina's 5th round pick in 2005 (Jared Boll) for Derrick Walser and this pick.  Chicago traded this pick to Toronto on June 24, 2006.
 St. Louis traded this pick to New Jersey on June 24, 2006.
 This pick was previously acquired by Carolina on a trade with Toronto on July 30, 2005. Toronto acquired Jeff O"Neill for this pick.
 This pick was previously acquired by Carolina on a trade with Chicago on December 30, 2005. Chicago acquired Radim Vrbata for future considerations which was completed on January 20, 2006.  Chicago acquired Danny Richmond and Carolina's 4th round pick for Anton Babchuk and this pick.

February

March 

Notes
 Minnesota traded this pick to Los Angeles on June 24, 2006.
 The conditions of this pick are unknown.  Minnesota traded this pick to Atlanta on June 14, 2006.
 Columbus had an option to take either Toronto's 2006 5th round pick or Toronto's 2007 4th round pick.  Columbus took the 2006 5th round pick.
 The Rangers traded this pick to Anaheim on March 9, 2006.
 The conditions to get this pick was if Los Angeles made the 2006 playoffs.  Not exercised since Los Angeles missed the 2006 playoffs.

Trade deadline 

Notes
 The condition was for a 4th round pick.  If Steve McCarthy re-signs with Atlanta, it becomes a 3rd round pick.  Vancouver traded this pick back to Atlanta on June 14, 2006.
 San Jose traded this pick to Columbus on June 24, 2006.
 This pick was previously acquired by the New York Rangers on a trade with San Jose on March 8, 2006. San Jose acquired Ville Nieminen for this pick.
 Pittsburgh traded this pick to San Jose on July 20, 2006.  San Jose traded this pick to Washington on June 22, 2007.  Washington traded this pick to Philadelphia on June 23, 2007.
 This pick was previously acquired by Vancouver on a trade with the New York Islanders on August 3, 2005. The Islanders acquired Brent Sopel for this pick.
 The condition for this pick was if Oleg Kvasha did not re-sign with Phoenix, Phoenix would receive the New York Islanders 5th round pick in the 2006 NHL Draft. Kvasha did not re-sign with Phoenix.
 The New York Islanders traded this pick to Boston on June 24, 2006.
 The New York Islanders traded this pick to Phoenix on June 24, 2006.
 This pick was previously acquired by Philadelphia on a trade with Florida on July 30, 2005. Florida acquired Philadelphia's 2005 1st round pick (#20 - Kenndal McArdle) for Florida's 2005 1st round pick (#29 - Steve Downie) and this pick.  Phoenix traded this pick to Detroit on June 24, 2006.
 This pick was previously acquired by Philadelphia on a trade with Tampa Bay on July 30, 2005. Tampa Bay acquired Philadelphia's 2005 3rd round pick (#89 - Chris Lawrence) and 2005 4th round pick (#102 - Blair Jones) for this pick.  Phoenix traded this pick to Detroit on June 24, 2006.
 Phoenix traded this pick to the New York Islanders on June 24, 2006.
 St. Louis traded this pick to the New Jersey on June 24, 2006.
 Chicago traded this pick to the Toronto on June 24, 2006.

June

See also
2005–06 NHL season
2005 NHL Entry Draft
2005 in sports
2006 in sports
2006–07 NHL transactions

References
 Free agents and pre-season trades at proicehockey.about.com
 hockeydb.com - search for player and select "show trades"

National Hockey League transactions
Trans